Goldstream Peak is a peak rising to about  at the junction of ridges from Mount Gjertsen, Mount Grier, and Johansen Peak, in the La Gorce Mountains of Antarctica. The peak was geologically mapped by a United States Antarctic Research Program – Arizona State University field party, 1980–81, and named by Edmund Stump, leader of the party. The name derives from a contact between shallow intrusions on the west face of the peak, which has produced gold, yellow, and brown coloration along a meandering line.

References

Mountains of Marie Byrd Land